Ontario Conservation Officers are the enforcement arm of the Ministry of Natural Resources and Forestry in Ontario, Canada. Conservation officers enforce provincial and federal laws related to natural resources, including fishing and hunting, and preventing forest fires.

Conservation officers (CO's) patrol the lakes, trails and back roads of Ontario to protect our natural resources, and ensure public safety. They are professional, armed peace officers trained to police standards. 

In 2015, Ontario’s conservation officers:

-made over 220,000 enforcement contacts
-issued close to 7,000 warnings
-laid nearly 3,000 natural resource charges

They also spent more than 8,900 hours educating the public on conservation and safety, providing information on:

-the regulations that protect species at risk
-how to recognize and help prevent the spread of invasive species
-prevention of forest fires
-boating safety and how to prepare fish for transport
-changes to fishing and hunting regulations
-how to report known or suspected resource abuse to the Ministry of Natural Resources and Forestry TIPS violation reporting line at 1-877-847-7667

Powers and authorities
Conservation officers enforce Ontario’s natural resources laws. They investigate and prosecute offenders under many federal and provincial statutes, relating to:
-fire
-fish and wildlife
-invasive species
-forestry
-aggregates (sand and gravel)
-public lands
-public safety (e.g. recreational vehicle use, forest fire prevention)
-Law enforcement

Conservation officers are empowered to:
-stop and/or inspect a vehicle, boat or aircraft
-inspect firearms, ammunition, fish or game
-inspect buildings or other places
-search with a warrant, and in circumstances requiring immediate action, without one
-seize items related to an offence
-ask questions relevant to the inspection
-arrest anyone who has committed, is committing or is about to commit an offence under many of the acts they are authorized to enforce.

Fun fact: The shoulder patch has been changed from a white polar bear, to a black bear, in order to reflect the Ontario emblem. It was erroneously changed to a polar bear numerous years ago. 

The officers are members of the Ontario Conservation Officers Association http://ocoa.ca/, and have an Ontario Conservation Officer History page with an Historical Images Gallery,  deceased Conservation Officer information list and more! http://ocoa.ca/conservation-officer-history/

References 

Law enforcement agencies of Ontario
Government agencies established in 1892
1892 establishments in Ontario
Forestry agencies in Canada